Pyotr Mikhailovich Shamshin (Russian: Пётр Михайлович Шамшин; (10 January 1811, Saint Petersburg – 6 February 1895, Saint Petersburg) was a Russian painter of historical and religious scenes in the Academic style.

Biography 
His father, was a painter who taught at the Imperial Academy of Arts.  At the age of ten, he entered the primary school at the Academy and studied with Pyotr Basin. In 1836, he was awarded a large gold medal for his depiction of the massacre of Niobe's children by Artemis and Apollo.

He graduated in 1838 with the title of "Artist" and a small gold medal for a scene from the Iliad. His title included a stipend to study abroad, so he went to Italy and remained there for seven years. After returning, he became a teacher at the Academy. He was named an "Academician" in 1844 for his paintings of Hagar in the desert and Peter the Great rescuing drowning soldiers near his estate in Lakhta; an act that probably hastened Peter's death.

He was awarded the title of Professor in 1853 for his version of the Resurrection. Six years later, due to changes in the Academy's charter, he was redesignated as an "Associate Professor". In 1863, he became a "Professor, First Degree". After holding that position for twenty years, he was named the Rector for painting and sculpture. Among his best-known students were Isaak Asknaziy, Viktor Bobrov and Vasily Smirnov. Shortly before his death, due to a new statute for the Academy, he was dismissed because of age. He was interred at Smolensky Cemetery. His tomb has not been preserved.

Most of his works were religious in nature and may be seen at Saint Isaac's Cathedral and the Cathedral of Christ the Saviour. He also painted for smaller churches throughout Russia, but some of those works were lost or destroyed during the early Soviet period.

Selected paintings

References

External links 

1811 births
1895 deaths
19th-century painters from the Russian Empire
Russian male painters
Religious artists
History painters
19th-century male artists from the Russian Empire